Hiraiwa (written: 平岩) is a Japanese surname. Notable people with the surname include:

, Japanese daimyō
, Japanese actress
, Japanese writer
, Japanese artistic gymnast

See also
Hiraiwa Station, a railway station in Itoigawa, Niigata Prefecture, Japan

Japanese-language surnames